The Crazy Man is a 2005 Canadian children's novel written by Pamela Porter. This realistic family novel told in free verse has received many awards and was selected for the Governor General's Literary Award. The story is about a girl named Emaline who lives on a farm. Emaline's family falls apart after a terrible tractor accident. After chasing her beloved dog, Emaline's father accidentally runs over her leg with a tractor leaving her permanently disabled. Because of guilt, Emaline's father shoots her dog, Prince, and ends up leaving Emaline and her mother on their own. The narrative follows Emaline as she deals with prejudice, fear, her disability, and the absence of her father.

Plot summary
The Crazy Man is set in 1965 in Saskatchewan, Canada. Pamela Porter reinforces the harsh times by incorporating day-to-day life during the Vietnam War, Communism, and The Cold War. Financial times were tough.

The novel begins by introducing the protagonist Emaline, a twelve-year-old girl who, like other little girls, loves playing with friends and going to school. Emaline lives on a farm, when she is involved in a terrible tractor accident. While trying to save her dog, Prince, from being run over by the tractor her father is driving, Emaline succeeds in saving her dog but unfortunately her leg is caught in the machine, and she is disabled. Grief-stricken, Emaline's father, Cal, shoots Prince, then leaves everything behind, the family farm, his family, his crippled child, and all his responsibilities. He blames himself for Emaline's injuries, but he also blames the dog for precipitating this tragic accident.

Emaline cannot understand why her father would do this to her and her mother. Throughout the novel, she continuously wonders why her father left and when her father would come back: "I think about dad. How in the world could someone just disappear?" As a result Emaline blames herself. The guilt Emaline feels about her father leaving consumes her thoughts.

Since Cal is no longer on the farm, there is no one left to seed the farm fields. During the spring time, Clarice, Emaline's mother has to find someone to seed the fields for them as farming is the only source of income for the family. Clarice cannot find anyone to seed their fields so she ends up hiring a big man called Angus, who is a former mental patient from the mental hospital. This infuriates the town, as they assume that this man will harm and terrorize them. 

Emaline's mom explains to her, "That man is from the mental, stay away from him." 

The townspeople purposely drive by Emaline's house to tease and laugh at "The Crazy Man" working in the farm fields. Frank, the town mechanic drives by daily and yells out, "I hear you have a sub-human out there", and others would call Angus "The Gorilla." 

What the townspeople do not realize is that Angus is an extremely gentle and caring individual who would not hurt anyone or harm anything. 

In fact Angus is a very good farmer and great gardener. He treats everything he touches with respect. However, the townspeople can not see past his mental illness, and on many occasions they accuse him of stealing from the local grocery store, later to find out that all accusations are false.

After Harry Record (Joey Record's father) drives Angus to the other end of town in attempt to make him suffer in a snowstorm, Angus comes across Joey freezing in the snow on his way back to the town. Despite the mistreatment Angus has experienced, he takes Joey to the hospital to save his life. After the town has heard what Angus has done, the townspeople realize that Angus is not only like everyone else, he is actually a brave and compassionate individual. 

The novel wraps up with the farm fields growing beautifully, the best they have ever grown, and Emaline, Clarice, and Angus happily dancing under the Northern Lights without Cal, enjoying life as they once had before the tractor accident. Like Miss Tollofsen always said, "Everyday is a fresh start. No matter what hijinks someone had done the day before." 

The main message of the novel is to treat every individual with respect regardless of their background or appearance.

Information about the author
Pamela Porter of Sydney, British Columbia is an influential Canadian writer and poet. Porter received her undergraduate degree in English from Southern Methodist University in Dallas and later gained her MFA in creative writing from the University of Montana.
Pamela Porter was born in Albuquerque, New Mexico on July 14, 1956. As Pamela grew up she lived in several other places within the United States such as Texas, Louisiana, Washington, and Montana. Although Porter lived in many places, she eventually settled down after meeting her husband. Currently Porter and her husband live in North Saanich British Columbia, Canada and every summer Porter and her family visit her husband’s farm in Saskatchewan to help work the fields and enjoy relaxing summer vacations. This is interesting because Porters novel The Crazy Man is set on the farmlands of Saskatchewan.

Awards 
Pamela Porter has won a phenomenal amount of prestigious awards for her novel The Crazy Man. She has received the Governor General’s Literary Award, the Canadian Library Association Book of the Year Award, the Bilson Award for Historical Fiction, and lastly the TD Canadian Children's Literature Award.

Character backgrounds
Cal Bitterman- Emaline's Father and Clarice’s husband. Cal shoots and burns the family dog after Emaline has a terrible accident with the farm tractor. Cal blames himself for the accident. Cal leaves everything behind without any notice and goes to work the railroad. He has no contact with his family after he leaves.
Prince- The family dog which Emaline loves and later finds out her father had killed him with a gun. The dead body was burned.
Clarice- Emaline's mother and wife to Cal.
Emaline- Protagonist and narrator of the novel. The story is based around her and her feelings around Angus and her father.
Reverend Douglas- Preacher and Mayor of Saskatchewan, passes a law in order to have Emaline's hospital fees paid for by the government.
Miss Sadie Tollfsen- Emaline's sixth grade teacher who visits her while in the hospital and encourages her artwork. She is not only Emaline's teacher but her friend.
Jamie Record- Son of Harry and Vida Record, school friend and neighbor of Emaline.
Joey Record- Son of Harry and Vida Record, school friend and neighbor of Emaline's. Joey almost dies  from a blizzard before Angus saves him. 
Harry Record- Parent of Jamie and Joey, husband of Vida. Harry strongly dislikes Angus and he attempts to murder Angus.
Vida Record- Wife and mother of Harry, Jamie, and Joey. 
Mei Wang- Emaline's friend from school. It is made clear in the novel that she and her family are Chinese.
Dr. Phillips- Emaline's doctor who works with Emaline to heal her broken leg from the tractor accident.
Angus- "The  Crazy Man" hired by Clarice to seed the farm when her husband walks out on them. Angus suffers from a mental illness and is not well received from the town until the end of the novel.
Frank- Town mechanic who drives by the farm only to taunt Angus and the family.
Mr. McGilivary- Town grocer of OK Economy grocery who accuses Angus of stealing.
D’Arcy Pettit- Chief Constabulary Officer (RCMP) .
Miss Griffin- Town Librarian.
Mr. Sidlosk- Angus’s doctor from the mental hospital. He helps Angus build a shoe for Emaline so she can walk properly.
Louise- Secretary at El Rancho Motel, where Emaline's father Cal stays after he leaves the family.
Mr. Liddle- Emaline's seventh grade teacher who encourages her to volunteer at an animal shelter. 
Mrs. Spiske- the owner of the animal shelter where Emaline volunteers. 
Meeka- Emaline's new dog (after Prince) which she got from the animal shelter where she volunteers.

References

External links
Tompson, Angela. "The Crazy Man," Resource Links. 11.2 (2005): n.pag. 
Parravano, Martha. “The Crazy Man.” Education Research Complete, Horn Book Magazine. 82. 1 (2006): n.pag. Web 24 October 2013 
Webb, Julie. "The Crazy Man." School Library Journal. 51. 12 (2005): n.pag. Web. 24 October 2013. 
Jenkinson, Dave. “Pamela Porter Profile” The Manitoba Library Association. (2007): n.pag. 24 October 2013. 

Canadian children's novels
2005 Canadian novels
2005 children's books
Children's historical novels
Verse novels
Novels set in Saskatchewan
Fiction set in 1965
Novels set in the 1960s
Novels about mental health
Governor General's Award-winning children's books